ROKS Cheonji (AOE-57) is the lead ship of the Cheonji-class fast combat support ship (AOE) in the Republic of Korea Navy. She is named after the lake, Cheonji.

Development 

After the Korean War, the Korean Navy purchased and operated small refueling ships from the 1960s to the 1980s. These ships were obsolete due to prolonged operation, which forced their retirement beginning in the late 1970s. As the demand for maritime operations increased day, the Navy required vessels to complete the missions. 

From the mid-1980s, based on ship drying experiences, the Korean Navy proposed building combat support ships domestically. From 1988 to 1990, the first combat support ship, later named Cheonji, was built and launched. Daecheong and Hwacheon were built seven years later. At the time, the Korean Navy decided whether or not to build follow-up ships after finishing the operation test of the first ship.

As the needs of support ships increased, the Navy designed the Soyang-class ships in 2016, based on the Cheonji class.

Construction and career 
ROKS Cheongju was launched on 29 December 1988 by Hyundai Heavy Industries and commissioned on 4 January 1991. She was the first logistic support ship built by the Navy and was the largest of the warships operated by the Navy at the time of commissioning.

In 1998, she was the flagship of the International Fleet Review of the Republic of Korea, and participated in the Japanese international naval ceremony in 2002 and the British naval warfare commemoration of the 200th anniversary of the Battle of Trafalgar in 2005.

Gallery

References

1990 ships
Cheonji-class fast combat support ships
Ships built by Hyundai Heavy Industries Group